Decimia  may refer to:
 Decimia, a synonym for a genus of mantises, Decimiana
 Decimia, a synonym for a genus of moths, Automolis
 Decimia gens, ancient Roman clan